The 1992 Oregon State Beavers football team represented Oregon State University in the Pacific-10 Conference (Pac-10) during the 1992 NCAA Division I-A football season.  In their second season under head coach Jerry Pettibone, the Beavers compiled a 1–9–1 record (0–7–1 against Pac-10 opponents), finished in last place in the Pac-10, and were outscored by their opponents, 363 to 163.  The team played its home games at Parker Stadium in Corvallis, Oregon.

Schedule

Personnel

Season summary

Oregon

References

Oregon State
Oregon State Beavers football seasons
Oregon State Beavers football